Hating Life is the fourth album by Swedish death metal band Grave. It was released on May 7, 1996 through Century Media Records.

Track listing

Personnel

Grave
 Ola Lindgren – vocals, guitar, bass
 Jens "Jensa" Paulsson – drums

Technical personnel
 Tomas Skogsberg – production
 Peter in de Betou – mastering
 Rolf Brenner – photography
 Karin Nilsson – winter photo

References

1996 albums
Grave (band) albums
Century Media Records albums